J. Clifford Ashby, generally known as Cliff Ashby, (10 November 1919 – 30 April 2012) was a British poet and novelist.

He was born in Norfolk in 1919, and left school aged 14, taking a job as a window dresser in Leeds.

He was a conscientious objector in the Second World War, undertaking agricultural work in lieu of military service. In so doing he met several artists and poets, and began the path to his own literary career.

As a poet he came to light through X magazine.

His poetry collections include In the Vulgar Tongue (1968), The Dogs of Dewsbury (1976), Lies and Dreams (1980), Plain Song: Collected Poems (1985) and A Few Late Flowers (2007). His novels are The Old Old Story and How and Why (both 1969).

He died at home on 30 April 2012.

On Ashby's Few Late Flowers (2008) Robert Nye says: "He has just published what must be the most remarkable swansong offered by a writer in their 89th year...A sequence of quietly original poems, it is the bittersweet distillation of a lifetime's experience"

Bibliography 
Old, Old Story ( / ),  Hodder & Stoughton Ltd, 1969
In the Vulgar Tongue ( / ), Hodder and Stoughton, 1968
Howe and Why, Hodder and Stoughton, 1970
The Dogs of Dewsbury Poems, Carcanet Press
Lies and Dreams Poems, Carcanet Press
Plain Song: Collected Poems, Carcanet, 1985
A Few Late Flowers, HappenStance Press, 2008

References

Further reading 
Carcanet Press 
Supplement, The Scotsman 
Poetry Nation 
Yorkshire Post 
Poetry Library, Southbank Centre, Ashby's poem: Latter Day Psalms 
Cliff Ashby Papers at the Harry Ransom Center

1919 births
2012 deaths
British conscientious objectors
People from Norfolk
English male poets
20th-century English poets
20th-century English male writers